Neil G. Clarke (sometimes listed as Clark) (born in Scotland) was a Scottish American soccer player who began his career in the Scottish Football League before migrating to the United States. He played in both the National Association Football League and American Soccer League. In 1916, he played in the first two U.S. national team games.

Professional career
Clarke began his career as a center forward but later moved to center half back. He played for Celtic in the Scottish Football League. In 1913, now based in the United States, he was with the Paterson True Blues of the National Association Football League (NAFBL) when Paterson won the American Cup finals against Diston The first game and first replay both ended in ties with Clarke scoring the tying goal in both games. In the second replay, Paterson won, 2-1, to take the Cup.  He then moved to Brooklyn Field Club, winning the 1914 National Challenge Cup with them.  In 1914, Clarke is listed with Bethlehem Steel. In 1915 and 1916, Bethlehem won the National Challenge Cup. He then moved to Babcock & Wilcox for a single season before moving to the Fall River Rovers of the Southern New England Soccer League in 1918. That year, Clarke was with Fall River when they lost the National Challenge Cup final to Bethlehem Steel. In 1920 and 1921, he played for Robins Dry Dock, which won the 1921 Challenge Cup. In 1921, the American Soccer League replaced the NAFBL as the top U.S. league. Todd Shipyards, the parent company of Robins Dry Dock, took over sponsorship of the team, renaming Todd Shipyard. The team folded at the end of the 1921-1922 season, and Clarke moved to the Fall River Marksmen. He saw little playing time and in 1923, he made his last move, this time to the Philadelphia Field Club. He left the ASL in 1925.

National team
Clarke earned two caps with the U.S. national team in 1916. In the first official U.S. national team game, the U.S. defeated Sweden on 20 August 1916. On 3 September 1916, Clarke and his team mates drew with Norway before returning to the U.S.

See also
List of United States men's international soccer players born outside the United States

External links
 Bethlehem Steel Soccer Club Bethlehem Globe, 11 July 1921

References

American soccer players
American Soccer League (1921–1933) players
Babcock & Wilcox F.C. players
Bethlehem Steel F.C. (1907–1930) players
Brooklyn Field Club players
Celtic F.C. players
Fall River Marksmen players
Fall River Rovers players
National Association Football League players
Scottish emigrants to the United States
Paterson True Blues players
Philadelphia Field Club players
Robins Dry Dock players
Southern New England Soccer League players
Todd Shipyards (soccer team) players
United States men's international soccer players
Year of death missing
Association football defenders
Association football forwards
Year of birth missing